Baruch of Benevento was an Italian Jewish Cabalist in Naples, during the first half of the 16th century.

He was the teacher of Cardinal Ægidius of Viterbo and of Johann Albrecht Widmanstadt in the Zohar and other cabalistic works, and lectured on these subjects in the house of Samuel Abravanel. In a note at the end of one of his manuscripts, Widmanstadt says: "Eodem tempore (MDXLI.) audivi Baruch Beneventanum optimum cabalistam, qui primus libros Zoharis per Ægidium Viterbiensem Cardinalem in Christianos vulgavit."

Graetz, Perles, and others have taken this to mean that Baruch translated the Zohar, or parts of it, into Latin; but Steinschneider has remarked that it means nothing more than that he made the Zohar known to Christian scholars.

References
Grätz, Gesch. der Juden, ix.48, 95, 161;
Perles, in Revue Etudes Juives, i.299;
idem, Beiträge zur Gesch. der Hebr. und Aramäischen Studien, Munich, 1884, pp. 154, 180;
Steinschneider, in Hebräische Bibliographie, xxi.81.

Year of birth missing
Year of death missing
Jewish scholars
Kabbalists
16th-century Neapolitan people
16th-century Italian rabbis
16th-century scholars